Novena MRT station is an underground Mass Rapid Transit (MRT) station on the North South Line. Located along Thomson Road in Novena, Singapore, the station is located near landmarks such as Tan Tock Seng Hospital, Mount Elizabeth Novena Hospital and United Square. Planned as part of Phase One of the MRT system, under the working name Thomson, the station's name was changed to Novena in November 1982, after the Novena Church. Construction of the station commenced in January 1984, and the station opened in December 1987.

History
The station was planned as part of Phase One of the MRT system's development, and was initially named Thomson. In November 1982, the station's name was changed to Novena, which the Provisional MRT Authority believed more accurately reflected the station's location.

In October 1983, Contract 104 for the construction of the Novena and Toa Payoh stations, and the tunnels between Toa Payoh and Newton stations, was awarded to two Japanese contractors, Tobishima and Takenaka. Construction of the station began in January 1984, and the station was built from the bottom up. In 1984, a Jewish cemetery along Thomson Road was cleared to make way for the station, with the graves reinterred in Choa Chu Kang, and to prevent soil subsidence, the tunnels connecting Novena and Newton were built in compressed air.

In June 1985, a worker was killed at the station site after receiving head injuries from being struck by moving components of a tunnel boring machine. Novena station opened on 12 December 1987, as part of the extension of the MRT system to Outram Park.

In April 2002, a lift connecting the concourse with the street level above was opened. Originally, the station's distinctive features are bright green wall tiles, but the tiles were all falling in 2005. The station was completely refurbished in May 2007, at the same time when Square 2 also opened. The elevators at Novena MRT station were replaced from September 2006 to May 2007.

Station details

Etymology
The station takes its name from the Novena Church, which it is close to.

Location and services
The station is located between Thomson Road and Sinaran Drive, underneath Novena Square. It is in proximity to Tan Tock Seng Hospital, Mount Elizabeth Novena Hospital, Revenue House, United Square and Square 2. The station serves the North South Line, and is located between Toa Payoh and Newton stations, with the station code NS20.

Design
The upper level acts as the station's concourse, and is used for ticketing control, while the lower-level houses the station's platforms. The station also contains walls clad in white tiles, and pillars that are emerald green.

When the station first opened, it included a sunken plaza, along with a landscaped pedestrian mall. The station's exits also were fitted with a steel honeycomb-like framework.

Cultural impact
The station is one of the MRT stations in Singapore rumoured to be haunted, possibly because the area used to be the site of a Jewish cemetery.

References

External links
 
 

Railway stations in Singapore opened in 1987
Novena, Singapore
Mass Rapid Transit (Singapore) stations